Bernard Desclot (in Catalan: Bernat Desclot) was a Catalan chronicler whose work covering the brief reign of Peter III of Aragon (1276–85) forms one of the four Catalan Grand Chronicles  through which the modern historian views thirteenth- and fourteenth century military and political matters in the  Kingdom of Aragon and the Principality of Catalonia, including the "Aragonese Crusade". Desclot's Chronicle begins in the eleventh century but gains especial interest when he comes to describe events current within living memory. Bernard's literary model was Romance, and his account is spiced with dramatic monologues of the central characters and thrilling episodes, such as the escape of Peter's brother, James II of Majorca, from the fortress of Perpignan, through the castle's drains.

Nothing of Bernard himself is known save what little can be gleaned through his Chronicle.

F.L. Critchlow provided an English translation of the section covering the reign of Peter III in Chronicle of the Reign of King Peter III of Aragon, 1276-85 (Princeton University Press) 1928.

Gallery

Notes

External links

 Webpage dedicated to Bernat Desclot at the AELC (Associació d'Escriptors en Llengua Catalana), written in English, Catalan and Spanish.

Spanish chroniclers
Crown of Aragon
History of Catalonia
Military history of Catalonia
Medieval Catalan-language writers
13th-century historians
1288 births
Year of death unknown
13th-century Catalan people